Lenkau is an Oceanic language spoken in a single village on Rambutyo Island in Manus Province, Papua New Guinea. It is spoken in Lenkau village, Rapatona Rural LLG.

References

External links 
 Kaipuleohone's Robert Blust collection includes written materials from Lenkau

Admiralty Islands languages
Languages of Manus Province